Anamur Lighthouse is a lighthouse in Anamur ilçe (district) of Mersin Province, Turkey.

History 
The lighthouse was constructed by a French firm in 1911, during the Ottoman Empire. Originally it was fuel powered lighthouse . But beginning by 1999 its power source is electricity.

Its visibility is 20 nautical miles.

References

Anamur
Lighthouses in Turkey